(The) End of Innocence may refer to:

Television
"End of Innocence" (Blue Heelers), an episode of Blue Heelers
"The End of Innocence" (The O.C.), an episode of The O.C.
"End of Innocence", an episode of Young Riders
"The End of Innocence", an episode of "Survivor: Marquesas
"The End of Innocence", an episode of season 5 of Highlander

Film 
End of Innocence (1957), by Leopoldo Torre Nilsson
The End of Innocence (1990), by Dyan Cannon
Warlock III: The End of Innocence, a direct-to-video film

Music
 End of Innocence, a studio album by Tony Kaye (2021)
End of Innocence (video), a music DVD by Nightwish
"End of Innocence", a song by Iced Earth from Dystopia

Literature
The End of Innocence, a book by Estelle Blackburn
The End of Innocence: Britain in the Time of AIDS, a book by Simon Garfield
The End of Innocence: A Memoir, a 2003 memoir of Chastity Bono, now Chaz Bono

Other uses
Quest of Persia: The End of Innocence, a video game

See also 
The End of the Innocence (disambiguation)
An End to Innocence, a book by Leslie Fiedler